UKTV Media Limited, simply known as UKTV, is a British multi-channel broadcaster, which, since 2019, has been wholly owned by BBC Studios (formerly BBC Worldwide), a commercial subsidiary of the BBC. It was formed on 1 November 1992 through a joint venture between the BBC and Thames Television. It is one of the United Kingdom's largest television companies.

UKTV's channels are available via a digital satellite or cable subscription in the UK and Ireland. The Dave, Drama, W and Yesterday channels are also available in the UK on Freeview and Freesat, two free-to-air television services in the UK.

Most programmes on the channels are repeat broadcasts of productions from the BBC archives, although the entertainment channels also feature some programmes produced by other companies and UKTV have commissioned a small number of programmes. Playout and other technical services are provided by SES.

The UKTV channels have broadcast in 16:9 widescreen format since 31 January 2008, although some programmes originally made in 4:3 format are screened in the compromise 14:9 semi-letterbox format.

History

Origins (1992–1997) 

UKTV started as a single channel, UK Gold. The original partners behind the channel were the BBC's commercial arm BBC Enterprises and the outgoing ITV contractor Thames Television, although before the launch the American cable operator Cox Enterprises stepped in and took a majority share, 65 percent, in exchange for underwriting the costs of launching the channel.

UK Gold launched on 1 November 1992, showing reruns of 'classic' archive programming from the archives of the BBC and Thames Television. In a sense, UK Gold succeeded British Satellite Broadcasting's Galaxy channel that had originally held these rights from the BBC.

Later on, United Artists Holding Europe stepped in as part owner, and that ownership eventually became a part of Flextech, which was controlled by the US cable company Tele-Communications Inc. (TCI). A second joint-venture satellite channel, called UK Living, began broadcasting on 1 September 1993 with programming targeted at female viewers. Also in 1993, Flextech gained its first stake in the station after acquiring TCI's TV interests in Europe. In 1996, it started discussions about increasing its stake to gain full control; at that point Flextech held 27% with Cox (38%), BBC (20%) and Pearson (15%). By the Autumn, Flextech held 80% of UK Gold. Flextech's main reason for increasing its stake in UK Gold was in anticipation of new talks with the BBC.

The launch of the UKTV network (1997) 

During 1996, Flextech and the BBC held talks about a partnership to launch a new range of channels under the name UKTV. BSkyB tried to compete against Flextech for the right to develop the BBC channels, but the BBC were against inviting BSkyB to participate in the pay-TV venture. BSkyB would have sought a significant share in the planned channels, in exchange for agreeing to offer them to its 3.8 million direct-to-home satellite subscribers. It was believed at the time that if it were spurned, BSkyB could develop competing channels before the Flextech-BBC launch, particularly arts and documentaries, as a spoiling tactic.

The deal between Flextech and BBC was completed and signed in March 1997. Initially it was assumed that the new channels would be BBC-branded: BBC Showcase, for entertainment; BBC Horizon, for documentaries; BBC Style, for lifestyle; BBC Learning, for schools, and BBC Arena, for the arts, plus three other channels including BBC Catch-Up, for repeats of popular programmes within days of their original transmission, a dedicated BBC Sport channel, and a TV version of Radio 1. Flextech wanted these channels to carry advertisements, but the BBC argued that BBC-branded services in the UK should not, as doing so would undermine the rationale of TV licensing.

A compromise was reached: BBC Showcase and BBC Learning, renamed BBC Choice and BBC Knowledge respectively before launch, would go ahead as BBC channels without commercials, while the deal with Flextech was passed to BBC Worldwide with control split 50/50, thus allowing the remaining channels to carry advertisements. The 'UK' prefix was chosen for these new channels to capitalise on the success of UK Gold, as the brand by then had become a household name. The 'UKTV' network launched on 1 November 1997 with three new channels; arts channel 'UK Arena', lifestyle channel 'UK Style' and documentary channel 'UK Horizons'. UK Gold retained its name but received a new look in line with the rest of the network. Although the new network didn't use the BBC name and logo, its graphics and branding was in other aspects similar to the ones used by the BBC channels. The new graphics for the BBC and UKTV were both designed by the same company, Lambie-Nairn. Shortly before launch, it was decided the channel UK Living also owned by Flextech was to be renamed Living, instead of becoming part of the new UKTV network due to the similarity in programming between the channel and UK Style. On the same date, UK Gold celebrated its 5th anniversary.

Digital expansion (1998–2007) 

With the launch of digital television in the UK brought about by Sky Digital and ONdigital in 1998, two new channels were launched to broadcast on the new platforms: 'UK Gold Classics', a sister channel to UK Gold showing older shows previously shown on UK Gold, and 'UK Play', a new comedy and music channel.

UK Gold Classics was short lived however, and relaunched as UK Gold 2 in April 1999. The new channel time-shifted the morning schedule of UK Gold from 7 pm for those who could not watch it at the original time.

To boost its popularity, UK Play was renamed Play UK and given a new look and new style of logo in November 2000, which the rest of the UKTV channels would adopt the following July. In November 2001, UK Style's food programming was moved to a new channel named 'UK Food'.

The rebranding of Play UK failed to make the channel more popular, and on 30 September 2002 it was shut down. October saw the launch of the new free -to-view digital terrestrial platform Freeview replacing ITV Digital, and with it the new history channel 'UK History', which was included in Freeview's licence to operate the platform. UK History took many of the history-related programming from UK Horizons. In January 2003, UKTV launched a lifestyle channel for Freeview called UK Bright Ideas. However UK Bright Ideas was not created for the same reasons as UK Food and UK History to allow other UKTV channels to have more time to schedule other programming, but instead showed a mix of programming from UK Style and UK Food (and later UKTV Gardens) for Freeview viewers, to promote the lifestyle UKTV channels available on pay platforms.

UK Gold 2 was relaunched with a completely new schedule and style as UKG2 on 12 November 2003, taking on some output similar to what used to be on Play UK before its closure, initially broadcasting from 8 pm each night before later expanding to daytime.

On 8 March 2004, the network carried out a major rebranding scheme where all of the UKTV channels changed their prefixes from UK to UKTV. UK Horizons was split into two channels – UKTV Documentary and UKTV People.

In 2005, the last new channel under the UKTV branding was launched, 'UKTV Style Gardens', later renamed in 2007 to 'UKTV Gardens'. Like UK Food, it allowed UK Style to focus more on its more home-oriented programming.

Network rebrand 

In 2007, UKTV G2 was renamed 'Dave' and began broadcasting on Freeview, replacing UKTV Bright Ideas, seen as an experiment in branding for the network. The name is said to be originated from the fact that "everyone knows a bloke called Dave", and that the name seems appropriate for a male-orientated channel.

On 11 June 2008, UKTV announced that it was beginning the process of rebranding its channels from generic, UKTV-prefixed names to individual and separate brands, after the successful launch of Dave.

The first stage of this rebranding began on 7 October 2008, when UKTV Gold was renamed G.O.L.D. (now Gold) and dropped its mixed entertainment schedule for pure comedy programming. UKTV Drama became the crime drama channel Alibi, and a new general entertainment channel called Watch (now W) was launched. It was with this rebrand that non-crime drama (such as Doctor Who and Jonathan Creek) was transferred to Watch. G.O.L.D. was on one level a continuation of the Gold name used since the channel's creation, but the letters also made up the channels new slogan: 'Go On Laugh Daily'.

As the UKTV network gradually rebranded from 2008, continuity announcers would usually say on each network ‘Created for the BBC, chosen by’ when a programme by the BBC was coming on (e.g. ‘Created for the BBC, chosen by G.O.L.D.).

2009 saw the rebranding of all of the remaining channels beginning in January with UKTV Documentary's rebrand to Eden, the name reflecting the nature programmes premiering on the channel. This was followed in February with UKTV People becoming Blighty, the new channel containing programming of the lives of the British population and the quirks of British society, and therefore explaining the slang name for Britain as the channel name. In March, UKTV History was rebranded as Yesterday, reflecting the channel's history-themed programming.

This was closely followed in April by the re-brand of UKTV Style to Home, the new channel retaining the previous DIY shows and home makeovers and also including the programming from UKTV Gardens; however, this programming would follow a few weeks later in May, when UKTV Gardens was closed. Its channel slot was taken by Really, a new female crime medical and real life channel, similar to Virgin Media's then named Living.

The final channel to be rebranded was UKTV Food, on 22 June 2009 as Good Food, to tie in with the BBC magazine of the same name. In June 2009 a final minor tweak to these new brands occurred when, for promotional purposes, trailers began to use the same style and all channels began to use a circle-shaped variation of their logo to show that they were part of one network, making cross-channel promotion easier than previously.

On 14 June 2011, UKTV announced it would be launching Really on Freeview channel 20 on 2 August 2011. This resulted in the timeshift channel Dave ja vu broadcasting reduced hours of 02:00–04:00 on Freeview only to keep the EPG number available for future use. Really was the third of UKTV's ten brands to launch on Freeview.

Scripps Networks Interactive acquisition 

Virgin Media were in talks, with a number of interested parties, to sell its 50% stake in UKTV. Bidders included Scripps Networks Interactive (a spin-off of the E. W. Scripps Company's cable television networks and online assets), Discovery Communications, ITV plc, FremantleMedia (RTL Group) and Channel 4. Channel 4 was the least interested party, and Discovery had made offers that had been rejected. BSkyB was also said to be interested. BBC Worldwide held first refusal rights and could exercise control over who bought the stake.

On 15 August 2011, Virgin Media agreed to sell its 50% stake UKTV to Scripps Networks Interactive in a deal worth £339m. Scripps paid £239m in cash, and about £100m to acquire the outstanding preferred stock and debt owed by UKTV to Virgin Media. Completion of the transaction was contingent on regulatory approvals in Ireland and Jersey, which was received on 3 October 2011. Related to the transaction, Scripps Networks Interactive and BBC Worldwide are negotiated an agreement whereby, after completion, BBC Worldwide would have the option, via a combination of cash and a package of digital rights for UKTV, to increase its shareholding from 50 percent to a maximum of 60 percent. Scripps Networks Interactive's existing voting rights and board representation would be unaffected by this proposed arrangement, which would be subject to BBC Executive and BBC Trust approvals.

BT Vision deal 
On 22 March 2012, it was announced that BT Vision would offer UKTV original content on-demand from later in the day. As part of the deal, UKTV started streaming linear channels to BT Vision set-top boxes in late 2012. The first three were Watch, Gold and Alibi and it intended to add further channels such as Good Food, Eden and Home. Dave, Really and Yesterday were not expected to be included as they are already on Freeview, which is available through BT's hybrid IPTV/Freeview set-top boxes.

Corporate rebrand (2013) 
UKTV announced on 18 March 2013 that it would reintroduce its company brand in celebration of its 21st year. The UKTV logo re-design went live across the identities of their channel network and programmes on Tuesday, 26 March 2013 for its 21st birthday.

Dispute with Virgin Media 
For almost three weeks in summer 2018, the UKTV channels were absent from Virgin Media. On 20 July 2018, it was announced that Virgin Media would stop broadcasting all of the UKTV channels from 22 July, amid a dispute over fees and the lack of on-demand content from the BBC. The companies were not able to agree terms and the channels ceased to be available at just after midnight on 22 July 2018. The channels returned to Virgin Media on 11 August 2018.

Split of channels between BBC and Discovery 
On 1 April 2019, Discovery Inc. (formerly Discovery Communications, which had acquired Scripps Networks Interactive in 2018) announced that BBC Studios would acquire its stakes in the seven entertainment-based UKTV channels for £173 million, along with the UKTV brand, and Discovery Inc. would acquire BBC Studios' stakes in the remaining channels Good Food, Home, and Really. The sale closed on 11 June 2019.
The sale was part of a larger agreement between the two companies for international streaming rights to the BBC's natural history programming.

Commercials on UKTV channels 
In 2003, UKTV announced plans of an experiment which examined the effect of different break patterns on advertising. UKTV teamed up with a number of advertisers to measure the effect of reductions in advertising spots, programme trailers and the number of breaks overall.

In February 2004, UKTV reduced the length of its ad breaks in a bid to retain viewers and attract advertisers after results of its research show that shorter breaks produce higher advertising recall levels. From 8 March, Its junctions were limited to a maximum of five minutes, with three-and-a-half minutes of commercial plus one-and-a-half minutes of promotional material, instead of a standard seven-and-a-half minutes.

UKTV's move was similar to a solution suggested by PHD executive strategy director Louise Jones at 2003 Marketing Week TV United Conference, with a view to cleaning up breaks. Her proposal was for broadcasters to reduce spots by 20 percent and to charge a corresponding price increase for them; the theory being clients would not have to boost their media spending, thus improving UKTV hopes a reduction in the length of break junctions would help it to keep viewers and provide advertisers with improved cut-through.

Channels 
UKTV's channels are available via satellite and cable in Ireland and the United Kingdom. In the UK, on digital terrestrial television, Yesterday, Dave, Drama and W are available on the Freeview platform. Selected parts of Gold, Home and Good Food were available through the now defunct Top Up TV service. The logo on the UKTV branded channels has also now been replaced by a new design.

Current free-to-air channels
UKTV's free-to-air channels are available on all platforms.

W
W is a female-skewing general entertainment channel, and is the flagship channel of the UKTV network. The channel launched as Watch on 7 October 2008. From launch until 2010, the channel's mascot was Blinky the eyeball, who was seen on the idents, logo, and website. A 2012 rebrand saw smoke, hairballs, crystals and liquid flying out of the logo. The channel was later rebranded under its current name in February 2016.

In February 2022, Broadcast magazine reported that the channel will become a free channel to air in the spring, joining stablemates Dave, Yesterday and Drama as a Freeview service. In March 2022, this was confirmed by UKTV with the channel due to be launched on Freeview channel 25 from 28 March 2022. UKTV said that this female skewing channel would be still targeted at a 25 to 44 age range but introduced a new logo for the free-to-air era which included the letter W in a slanted rectangle.

Dave
Dave is a comedy-oriented entertainment channel. The channel originally came together after UK Gold 2, an evening timeshift service of UK Gold, was reinvented to aim towards a more younger 16-34-year-old audience and was relaunched as UK G2 on November 12, 2003, becoming the more "edgy and contemporary" counterpart to UK Gold. As with its predecessor, UK G2 only broadcast at night, from 8 pm-5 am. It later rebranded as UKTV G2 in March 2004, and soon expanded its hours to the daytime as well.

On 15 October 2007, UKTV G2 rebranded as Dave, becoming the first in the network not to use UKTV or any UK branding. UKTV said the name of the channel was chosen because "everyone knows a bloke called Dave". The rebrand included the channel being available free-to-air on Freeview, replacing UKTV Bright Ideas which only averaged a 0.1% audience share. The move to Freeview saw Dave launch in the bandwidth previously used by Yesterday (previously known as UKTV History) which now uses the time limited (07:00–18:00) bandwidth once occupied by UKTV Bright Ideas. Dave is available daily from 7 am to 3 am on all platforms. It calls itself "the home of witty banter" and now uses Ralph Ineson and Phill Jupitus as announcers.

Yesterday

Yesterday focuses on history and archive programmes. It originally launched on 30 October 2002 as UK History, as part of the launch of Freeview, and was broadcast on the same EPG bandwidth that formerly housed Play UK. The channel rebranded as UKTV History in March 2004. Hours on Freeview were cut when Dave launched, with transmissions finishing at 18:00, but were restored on 1 June 2010.

The channel relaunched as Yesterday in March 2009. Yesterday's main focus is on programmes with historical topics and biographies, nature and wildlife, and some historical fiction, often from the BBC archives.

Drama
Drama focuses itself as a  home for British dramas from the last 40 years. The channel became the fourth UKTV channel to launch on Freeview, after UKTV Yesterday, UKTV Dave and Really.

Current pay-TV channels
UKTV's pay-TV channels are available on Sky and Virgin Media, but not Freeview or Freesat.

Gold
Gold focuses on comedy and was until 2008 the flagship channel of the UKTV network. It launched on 1 November 1992 as UK Gold, making it the oldest channel of the network as well.

Gold originally operated as a joint venture between Thames Television and BBC Enterprises to show reruns of their archive programming. Within the launch of the UKTV network and as the years went on, the output of  UK Gold (renamed UKTV Gold in 2004) was mainly British comedy programmes and sometimes feature-length films. These are a combination of internally produced shows and repeats of shows from the BBC and ITV archives. In recent years, original programmes have aired on the channel and the US version of Dancing with the Stars has had its first UK airing on the channel.

UKTV Gold was relaunched as G.O.L.D. (Go On Laugh Daily) on the morning of 7 October 2008 as it transitioned exclusively to comedy programmes, with the entertainment programming moving to Watch (W). The channel rebranded again to simply Gold in 2010.

Eden

Eden focuses on documentaries and factual programming. The channel launched on 8 March 2004 as UKTV Documentary, as a two-way split from UK Horizons (the other being the defunct UKTV People (Blighty)). The channel airs natural history documentaries such as Planet Earth.

Alibi
Alibi focuses on crime drama and suspense thrillers. It originally launched as a rebranding of UK Arena as UK Drama in March 2000, focusing on all kinds of drama programmes. It rebranded as UKTV Drama in March 2004, and on 2 May 2006, a new timeshift service called UKTV Drama +1 was launched, to replace UKTV People's timeshift channel.

It was relaunched as Alibi on the morning of 7 October 2008 and is now fully focused on crime dramas which are mainly taken from the BBC and ITV archives.

Catch-up service

In June 2014 UKTV launched a catch-up service, UKTV Play. Launching on iOS in August, on PC, YouView and Virgin Media in November, on Android devices in February 2015 and on Freesat in September 2018. The interactive service features content from the channels Dave, Yesterday, W, and Drama.

In addition to UKTV Play, some of the networks also have catch-up services. catch-up services for Watch, Gold, Dave and Alibi were launched on Sky Go in October 2013, alongside all UKTV channels launching on Eircom's eVision TV service and Gold launching on Now TV. The following month all channels appeared on Virgin TV Anywhere.

Former channels
UKTV has also had many former channels which have been replaced by others.

UK Arena
UK Arena was one of the original three UKTV network channels, launching on 1 November 1997. The channel focused on airing arts and cultural programmes and was named after BBC's Arena programme.

The channel was relaunched on 31 March 2000 as UK Drama, with a focus on showing dramas rather than general arts programmes.

Play UK
Play UK focused heavily on music and comedy programming, and was the first of the UKTV networks to initially launch digitally (and also to coincide with the launch of OnDigital (later ITV Digital)). It launched as UK Play on 10 October 1998 to coincide with the launch of Sky Digital, with a majority of its scheduling consisting of music in the morning and afternoon while broadcasting comedy in the evening, and rebranded as Play UK in November 2000, becoming the first of the UKTV networks to gain the new logo.

The channel broadcast for 24 hours a day on digital platforms, but also aired as a filler channel on the Sky Analogue platform (on the Astra 19.2°E satellites), broadcasting between 1 am and 7 am within UK Horizons' slot during its downtime.

The closure of ITV Digital led to the channel's viewership decreasing significantly, and its failure to complete with MTV also corresponded to its decline. The channel closed on 30 September 2002 on all platforms, and a month later on 30 October, its vacated EPG bandwidth space was used to launch a brand new channel for the launch of the Freeview platform - UK History. The programmes that formerly aired on Play UK would move on UK Gold, and eventually UK G2.

UK Gold Classics
UK Gold Classics was a sister channel to UK Gold that broadcast older comedy programming. It launched on 10 October 1998 as one of two digital-exclusive UKTV channels.

The channel was relaunched as UK Gold 2 on 2 April 1999.

UK Gold 2
UK Gold 2 was a secondary timeshift service for UK Gold that aired the channel's daytime programming in the evening. It was relaunched from UK Gold Classics on 2 April 1999.

The channel closed on 11 November 2003, and relaunched as the younger-oriented and edgier UK G2 the following day.

UK Horizons
UK Horizons was one of the original three UKTV network channels, launching on 1 November 1997. The channel focused on airing documentaries and other factual programmes and was named after BBC's Horizon programme, which itself formed a staple of its output in the early years. It also produced extended versions of top BBC brands such as Top Gear and Tomorrow's World. The launch editor was Bryher Scudamore and the deputy editor Eddie Tulasiewicz.

The channel closed on 7 March 2004, as part of UKTV's relaunch. UK Horizons was split into two new channels - UKTV Documentary and UKTV People, which both launched the following day on 8 March. The UK Horizons +1 timeshift service was taken for UKTV Documentary.

UKTV People +1
UKTV People +1 was a Sky-exclusive timeshift service for UKTV People that launched on 12 January 2005.

It closed on 18 April 2006 for unknown reasons, Its EPG bandwidth was taken over for UKTV Drama +1 (Now Alibi +1), which itself launched in May 2006.

UKTV Bright Ideas
UKTV Bright Ideas originally launched as UK Bright Ideas in January 2003. It was a highlights network aimed at Freeview viewers that showed programmes that were broadcast on UKTV Style, UKTV Food and UKTV Gardens, and are thus mainly cookery, DIY and gardening. However, in January 2005, it began showing programmes branded by UKTV Sport, presumably to increase potential audience figures by extending the programme to Freeview viewers.

Bright Ideas was initially a Freeview exclusive, but later expanded. It ceased broadcasting on all platforms on 14 October 2007 at 6 pm. The main aim for the closure was also for UKTV G2's rebranding into Dave, with the channel able to launch on Freeview, and to allow UKTV G2/Dave's timeshift service to broadcast within the daytime on Sky and Virgin Media, as it shared the same EPG bandwidth. The ex-slot on Sky was later used for UKTV Style +2.

UKTV Style +2
UKTV Style +2 was a Sky-exclusive two-hour timeshift service for UKTV Style that launched on 13 December 2007, using UKTV Bright Ideas' former EPG slot.

The channel's existence was solely as a filler network, whenever UKTV needed the space for another channel. It closed on 15 September 2008, in order to prepare for the launch of Watch.

UKTV Gardens
UKTV Gardens was the second offshoot network of UKTV Style, and launched in February 2005 as UKTV Style Gardens. As the name implied, the channel aired programmes in relation to gardening. The channel name was shortened to UKTV Gardens in 2007.

On 19 May 2009, the channel was replaced with Really, with all the gardening programmes moving back to the newly-rebranded Home.

Blighty
Blighty was a factual network that originally launched on 8 March 2004 as UKTV People, as a two-way split from UK Horizons (the other being the defunct UKTV Documentary (Eden)). The output of Blighty was some factual programming of a lighter nature, such as Top Gear and docusoaps like Airport, and from February 2009 following its rebranding, "British" shows like "My Brilliant Britain". However, the majority of the channel's programming was abridged by the BBC for commercial timing purposes, a policy that some critics consider hypocritical.

The channel was available on Sky and Virgin Media. However, it was not available on Freeview, despite the majority of the programmes being made by the BBC.

The channel closed on all platforms on 5 July 2013, three days ahead of the launch of Drama.

Good Food
Good Food focused on food and cookery programming. It originally launched on 1 November 2001 as UK Food, as the first offshoot network of UK Style. It rebranded as UKTV Food in March 2004, and eventually as Good Food in June 2009, being the last UKTV channel to rebrand.

Good Food broadcast a range of food and cookery programmes, similar to that of the content of BBC Worldwide's BBC Food service. Initially, most of the channel's output was aired on Home as well. The Good Food website originally devised and launched by Ian Fenn and Ally Branley provides a number of services including information on programmes shown on the channel, recipes, message boards, and a wine club. Recipes come from the various shows on Good Food and some include videos taken from the demonstrations. In September 2006 Good Food's website overtook the BBC Food site in popularity for the first time, achieving a 10% market share, against the 9.63% the BBC Food site dropped to, having held the top spot since it began. It was named "Good Food Channel" on the UKTV website due to the fact that there is a magazine named Good Food.

Following the split of the UKTV network from BBC Studios and Discovery, Inc. on 1 April 2019, Discovery took over control of Good Food, but they eventually closed the channel a few months later on 12 September, merging all its programming into their existing sister channel Food Network.

Home
Home was one of the original three UKTV network channels, launching on 1 November 1997 as UK Style. The channel broadcast home improvement, food, DIY and gardening programmes that are a combination of internally produced shows and repeats of shows mainly from the BBC archive. Eventually, the food programmes were moved onto an offshoot network UK Food (Good Food) in November 2001, and the gardening programmes followed suit onto UKTV Style Gardens in February 2005. It was rebranded as UKTV Style in March 2004, and eventually the channel was rebranded as Home in April 2009.

On 1 March 2016, Home became a free-to-air network as it launched on Freeview.

Following the split of the UKTV network from BBC Studios and Discovery, Inc. on 1 April 2019, Discovery took over control of Home, and in June, Discovery announced that the channel would be rebranded under their HGTV brand, with the channel rebranding as such on 21 January 2020.

Really
Really focuses entirely on medical crime, real life and lifestyle shows and was another offshoot from UKTV Style. It launched on 19 May 2009, replacing UKTV Gardens.

Following the split of the UKTV network from BBC Studios and Discovery, Inc. on 1 April 2019, Discovery took over control of Really.

CCXTV
In October 2020, UKTV Media took over the licence of the Freeview channel CCXTV, a channel which had been set up by Ideal Shopping Direct Ltd as a sister channel to their Create and Craft shopping channel. CCXTV was launched on 15 April 2020 as an entertainment channel and took over Create and Craft's channel number (Freeview 23), broadcasting from 7am till 10pm. Even though Create and Craft still had a shopping slot early on in the morning on Channel 23, the rest of the schedule was made up of imports and re-runs of shows like The Bold and The Beautiful. On 7 December 2020 CCXTV moved to Freeview channel 73, with Dave Ja Vu moving to channel 23.

On 25 January 2021, it was announced that timeshift channel Drama+1 would be taking over Freeview channel 73 on 1 February 2021, with CCXTV ending transmission.

UK Living
UK Living was originally affiliated with UK Gold but did not become part of the UKTV network, instead transferring to Flextech to be operated as a wholly owned company, and it changed its name to Living before the UKTV network launched.

GoldText
Also, an analogue teletext service known as GoldText was available on UK Gold, but has since closed down.

Operating names 

In the production logo screen at the end of UKTV's original commissions, for the channels Watch, Gold and Dave the name UK Gold Services Ltd. is used instead of UKTV, as all three channels spawned from the original UK Gold channel. For the remaining channels, Alibi, Drama, Eden and Yesterday, the name UKTV New Ventures Ltd. is used instead of UKTV.

HD channels 
UKTV launched its first HD channel; Good Food HD on 31 August 2010. The channel was originally available exclusively on Sky channel 283.

Eden HD launched on 4 October 2010 on Sky channel 559 and was the second HD simulcast from UKTV. Both channels are high-definition simulcasts of their standard definition counterparts.

UKTV announced on 29 July 2011 that they would be launching three new HD channels, Dave HD and Watch HD (now known as W HD) launched in October 2011, and Alibi HD launched in July 2012.

As part of Virgin Media's deal to sell its share of UKTV, all five of UKTV's HD channels were also added to Virgin's cable television service by 2012. Eden HD and Good Food HD were added on 7 October 2011, followed by Dave HD on 10 October and Watch HD on 12 October.

On 2 October 2017, UKTV launched Gold HD, replacing Eden HD on Sky.

Awards and nominations

See also 
 UKTV Car of the Year 2007

References

External links 
 

 
Former Warner Bros. Discovery subsidiaries
Television networks in the United Kingdom
Mass media companies established in 1992
Companies based in the London Borough of Hammersmith and Fulham
1992 establishments in the United Kingdom
Former E. W. Scripps Company subsidiaries